Dario Zanatta (born 24 May 1997) is a Canadian soccer player who plays as a forward  for Scottish club Hamilton Academical. Zanatta has spent his entire senior career in Scotland and has previously played for Heart of Midlothian, Queen's Park, Alloa Athletic, Partick Thistle, and Ayr United. He has also represented the Canadian national team at youth level.

Club career

Youth 
Zanatta grew up playing for Gorge Soccer Association and Lower Island Metro during his childhood years. As a teenager, he played as a forward and midfielder for the Victoria Capitals youth program before joining Vancouver Whitecaps Residency in 2011, aged 14. Zanatta was offered a spot in the academy and slowly worked his way up the academy ranks. He left Vancouver in February 2015, having been unable to agree to terms on a contract and set his ambitions on Europe and went on trial with several European clubs, including Ipswich Town, IFK Göteborg and Heart of Midlothian.

Heart of Midlothian 
Zanatta signed his first professional contract on 6 August 2015, signing with Scottish Premiership side Heart of Midlothian, on a two-year contract, initially joining up with the club's under-20 side. Zanatta made his first team debut on 31 October, coming on as a 70th-minute substitute in a Scottish Premiership match against Partick Thistle at Firhill Stadium, replacing Sam Nicholson in a 4–0 win. In January 2016, Zanatta was originally expected to be loaned to a lower division club, but he impressed Hearts coach Robbie Neilson enough to stay with the first team.

Loans to Queen's Park 
In September 2016, Hearts announced they had loaned Zanatta to Queen's Park of the Scottish League One on a one-month emergency loan. He made his debut for Queen's Park on 24 September 2016 against Albion Rovers, impressing after only being with the squad for one training session. In November 2016, Zanatta scored his first goal as a professional in a match against Stranraer.

Zanatta returned from loan in December 2016, and made his Hearts season debut against Kilmarnock, drawing and missing a penalty. On 31 January 2017, Zanatta joined Queen's Park on another loan, this time, until the end of season.

Loans to Raith Rovers 
On 31 August 2017, it was revealed that Zanatta had joined Raith Rovers on a loan deal until the end of the season. After impressing in his loan spell, Zanatta was recalled by Hearts in January 2018, and his departure was considered a significant blow to Rovers' promotion battle with Ayr United. In his first appearance with Hearts after his recall, Zanatta would score his first goal for the club in a 3–0 win over Hamilton Academical. At the end of January 2018, Zanatta was loaned again to Raith Rovers for the rest of the 2017–18 season.

Loan to Alloa Athletic 
In August 2018, Zanatta moved on loan to Scottish Championship club Alloa Athletic until January 2019. He would be named Championship player of the month for December 2018. After a strong first half of the season with Alloa, Zanatta was rewarded with a one-year contract extension with Hearts, with his loan being extended to the end of the 2018–19 season.

Partick Thistle 
Zanatta left Hearts in August 2019 and signed a two-year contract with Partick Thistle. Zanatta made his Jags debut on the 31st of August against Ayr United, winning a penalty for the opener before assisting Shea Gordon after dribbling past 5 opposition players. He was named man of the match on his debut appearance. Zanatta scored his first goal for the Jags in a 3–1 away league win against Inverness Caledonian Thistle. Following Thistle's early relegation due to the COVID-19 pandemic, Zanatta invoked a release clause in his contract and he left the club on June 7, 2020.

Ayr United
On July 21, 2020, Zanatta signed for Championship club Ayr United on a one-year deal.

Raith Rovers 

In March 2021, Zanatta would sign a pre-contract with Championship club Raith Rovers for the 2021-22 season. He would make his debut for the club in July 2021 in a League Cup tie against Cowdenbeath.

Hamilton Academical

In August 2022, Zanatta moved to fellow Championship side Hamilton Academical for an undisclosed transfer fee and signed a two-year contract.

International career 
In August 2016, Zanatta was called up to the Canada U-20 team for a pair of friendlies against Costa Rica and scored a goal in the first match. In February 2017, Zanatta was named to Canada's roster for the 2017 CONCACAF U-20 Championship

Zanatta was named to the Canadian U-23 provisional roster for the 2020 CONCACAF Men's Olympic Qualifying Championship on February 26, 2020.

Career statistics

Personal life 
Zanatta grew up in Victoria, British Columbia and attended Prospect Lake Elementary School, Royal Oak Middle School, then Holy Cross Regional High School in Surrey, British Columbia and graduated from Burnaby Central Secondary School.

Honours
Raith Rovers
 Scottish Challenge Cup: 2021–22

References

External links 

1997 births
Living people
Association football forwards
Canadian soccer players
Soccer players from Victoria, British Columbia
Expatriate footballers in Scotland
Canadian expatriate soccer players
Canadian expatriate sportspeople in Scotland
Vancouver Whitecaps FC players
Heart of Midlothian F.C. players
Raith Rovers F.C. players
Queen's Park F.C. players
Alloa Athletic F.C. players
Scottish Professional Football League players
Canada men's youth international soccer players
Partick Thistle F.C. players
Ayr United F.C. players
Hamilton Academical F.C. players